Normans is an unincorporated community in Queen Anne's County, Maryland, United States.

References

Unincorporated communities in Queen Anne's County, Maryland
Unincorporated communities in Maryland
Kent Island, Maryland